Route 15, the Girard Avenue Line, is a trolley line operated by the Southeastern Pennsylvania Transportation Authority (SEPTA) along Girard Avenue through North and West Philadelphia, Pennsylvania, United States. , it is the only surface trolley line in the City Transit Division that is not part of the Subway–Surface Trolley Lines (although it is designated as such on SEPTA's rail maps). SEPTA PCC II vehicles are used on the line.

The line was first opened in 1859 as a horse car line operated by the Richmond and Schuylkill River Passenger Railway, and electrified in 1895, with extensions in 1902 and 1903. Service was "bustituted" in 1992, along with Route 23 (Germantown Avenue-11th and 12th Streets) and Route 56 (Torresdale-Erie Avenues). On September 4, 2005, trolley service was restored.

On April 29, 2012, the east of Frankford Ave the line started being operated by buses due to major reconstruction; west of Frankford is still run by PCC II. Trolleys terminated at Frankford and Delaware Avenues (Northern Liberties Loop) while buses terminated at Girard Station under the Market-Frankford Line. , the full line is being substituted by a bus bridge to allow for rolling stock maintenance, track repairs, and a nearby highway expansion. Trolley service was anticipated to return in late 2021. Currently, Trolley service is still suspended, but may make a return in 2023.

Route
The Girard Avenue Line's  route runs along Girard Avenue and Richmond Street. The western terminus of Route 15 is at the intersection of Girard Avenue and 63rd Street, at the Haddington Loop, and instantly passes by Carroll Park. The next landmark is Cathedral Cemetery, which is on the corner of US 30 (Lancaster Avenue), where both Girard Avenue and Route 15 briefly overlap, along with the SEPTA Route 10 trolley. The line leaves Lancaster Avenue and resumes its way along Girard Avenue. After crossing over the Philadelphia–Harrisburg line at the intersection with Belmont Avenue, the line passes by the Philadelphia Zoo near Exit 342 on the Schuylkill Expressway before crossing the Schuylkill River over the Girard Avenue Bridge.

After entering Brewerytown, Route 15 loops partially around the south side of Girard College, but rejoins Girard Avenue again, and passes by St. Joseph's Hospital. The first mass transit crossing the line encounters is the Broad Street Line's Girard Station, and two blocks from there crosses the SEPTA Route 23 bus line which was originally a trolley line that may be restored in the future, however SEPTA has removed all connecting track & overhead wires for Route 23 at this location in 2014 completely ending any connection to the North Philadelphia Trolley Network. Directly east of the SEPTA Main Line at 9th Street, Route 15 passes by the Girard Medical Center. At Front Street Route 15 runs beneath the Market–Frankford Line's Girard Station, and then crosses Frankford Avenue, one of the two streets the line is named after.

In 2011, SEPTA completed a new loop for Route 15 at the intersection of Frankford and Delaware Avenues, reached via new trackage down Frankford from Girard. On April 29, 2012, SEPTA began using this loop. This loop is across from the Rivers Casino which opened in September 2010, and is also a natural turnback point due to high ridership turnover at Front Street and Girard for the Market-Frankford Line. The loop will be the temporary eastern terminus of Route 15 when SEPTA finishes replacing track on Richmond between Girard Ave and Ann Street between spring and late 2012, due to Interstate 95-related reconstruction along Richmond Street (see section below).

Girard Avenue ends at Exit 23 on I-95, so Route 15 moves beneath the highway onto Richmond Street, parallel to I-95 until it crosses over the street from the north side to the south side before Exit 25, the interchange with Allegheny Avenue, where it connects to the SEPTA Route 60 bus, another former trolley line. The road runs along the Richmond Playground before Route 15's eastern terminus at the Westmoreland Loop, on the southwest corner of the intersection of Richmond Street and Westmoreland Street.

In addition to the Frankford and Delaware loop, two other short-turn loops exist: at 41st & Parkside, just west of the Philadelphia Zoo, and at 26th & Girard (a bidirectional "in-line" cutback utilizing 26th and Poplar Streets and Girard and College Avenues). No scheduled runs use these loops. Another such loop, located at Richmond Street & Cumberland Avenues, was frequently used when Richmond Street was blocked by trucks which failed to heed warning signs and flashing lights for a low bridge underneath the former Reading Port Richmond Yard of Conrail Shared Assets Operations. This loop has since been removed. Cars returning to Callowhill Depot turn off Girard at 60th Street.

History
The Richmond and Schuylkill River Passenger Railway was chartered by the Pennsylvania General Assembly on March 26, 1859 to operate along Girard Avenue between the Girard Avenue Bridge over the Schuylkill River in Fairmount Park and Norris Street in Richmond, with an extension authorized west over the bridge to Lancaster Avenue. The line opened from Second Street to 31st Street in July 1859. The company was sold at foreclosure and reorganized as the Fairmount Park and Delaware River Passenger Railway on June 14, 1864, and was merged into the Germantown Passenger Railway (Route 23 Germantown Avenue) on February 15, 1866.

Extensions were opened east to Palmer Street in 1866 (looping via Palmer, Beach, and Shackamaxon Streets) and to Norris Street in 1875. The People's Passenger Railway leased the line on October 1, 1881, and leased the Girard Avenue Railway (chartered May 17, 1894) on June 22, 1896, extending the line west to 60th Street in 1900. The Union Traction Company leased the People's Passenger Railway on July 1, 1896, giving it control over almost all the street railways in Philadelphia. Girard Avenue cars were extended west to 63rd Street and east to Allegheny Avenue – the latter extension along the ex-Electric Traction Company Bridesburg Line on Richmond Street – in 1903, and eventually replaced the Bridesburg Line entirely to Bridesburg. In 1992, SEPTA replaced trolley service along Routes 15, 23, and 56 with buses.

PCC cars were first introduced to Route 15 on Sundays (and later on Saturdays as well) in 1948 using postwar cars at Callowhill Depot that would have been otherwise idle on the weekend.  They provided all service on the 15 in June 1955 after a cascade of postwar cars from other lines occurred when used PCC cars were purchased from St. Louis and Kansas City, Missouri. Service was cut back to Richmond & Westmoreland on February 24, 1956. PCCs provided all trolley service until SEPTA replaced the trolleys with buses on September 13, 1992. Trolley service returned briefly to Route 15 later in the 1990s using Kawasaki cars from Route 10 temporarily made surplus by water main replacement along the surface portion of Route 10.

2005 trolley restoration
The 15 line returned to trolley service on September 4, 2005 after having been served by buses for thirteen years. To prepare for the resumption of trolley service, SEPTA spent a total of $100 million, including rehabilitating the tracks and repairs to the overhead wires. The rolling stock for Route 15 consists of PCC II cars, which are 1947 St. Louis Car-built PCC streetcars that had been completely rebuilt by the Brookville Equipment Company at a cost of $1.3 million per trolley in 2003-2004.  The rebuilt trolley includes the addition of air conditioning and regenerative braking, as well as a widened center door with a wheelchair lift for ADA compliance.

The restoration of trolley service was delayed because of a long fight with local residents on 59th Street, which the trolleys needed to travel down in order to access the Callowhill Depot, over parking on the street. During the reconstruction of the line the surrounding neighborhoods, through grassroots coalitions, worked to improve the Girard Avenue streetscape through beautification and marketing projects. Since service returned in 2005, the 15 line has spurred various development projects as well as renewed investment along the corridor.

In 2018 a comprehensive analysis of SEPTA's surface operations called for abandonment of trolley operations citing the rail car's inability to get around double-parked cars and other obstacles.

Port Richmond reconstruction and I-95
Route 15 east of the new Northern Liberties loop is being rebuilt as part of a reconstruction project for Interstate 95. The components of the I-95 project related to Route 15 include reconstruction of Girard Avenue's bridge over Aramingo Avenue, and widening and partial realignment of Richmond Street. All the tracks in these areas will be replaced, except for the Richmond & Cumberland loop which will be removed. Also part of the project is the construction of four separate bridges for Conrail tracks over a realigned Richmond Street to replace the low-clearance nuisance bridge left over from the former Port Richmond Yard. The new bridges, rationalized in width to current Conrail trackage, will provide much greater road clearance by virtue of being relocated away from underneath the I-95 viaduct. Route 15 east of Frankford Avenue to the Frankford and Delaware Avenue station and the SugarHouse Casino will be served by a shuttle bus for the duration of the project, which is expected to last through 2018. On January 21, 2020, SEPTA officials announced that buses would be replacing the streetcars along the whole route for a period of at least 18 months.

2020 redesign plans

In 2021, SEPTA proposed rebranding their rail transit service as "SEPTA Metro", in order to make the system easier to navigate. Under this proposal, services along the Girard Avenue Line will be rebranded as the "G" lines with a yellow color, with each service receiving a numeric suffix. Local service would become the G1 Girard Avenue Local. In addition, there are plans to extend the 15 from 63rd Street and Girard Avenue further west to 69th Street Transportation Center. This route would follow the 30 route along Haverford Avenue and Cardington Road between 63rd-Girard and 69th Street Transportation Center.  Following a period of public comment, Route 15's proposed name was simplified to "G Line."

Stations
All stations are in the City of Philadelphia.

References

External links

  and  
Photos of SEPTA Route 15 trolleys

Railway lines opened in 1859
Railway lines closed in 1992
Railway lines opened in 2005
Railway lines closed in 2020
15
Streetcars in Pennsylvania
Heritage streetcar systems
5 ft 2¼ in gauge railways in the United States
Tram routes in Philadelphia
1859 establishments in Pennsylvania
600 V DC railway electrification
Heritage railroads in Pennsylvania